Gisela of Burgundy (1075–1135), was a Countess consort of Savoy and a Marchioness consort of Montferrat. She was the spouse of Humbert II, Count of Savoy and later of Rainier I of Montferrat whom she married after Humbert's death. She was the daughter of William I, Count of Burgundy.

With her first husband, Humbert II of Savoy, whom she married in 1090, her children included: 
 Amadeus III of Savoy
 William, Bishop of Liège
 Adelaide of Maurienne (d. 1154), wife of King Louis VI of France 
 Agnes, (d. 1127), wife of Arcimboldo VI, lord of Bourbon
 Humbert
 Reginald
 Guy, abbot of Namur

By her second marriage to Rainier, Marquess of Montferrat, her children were: 
 Joanna, who married William Clito, Count of Flanders, in 1127, and was widowed a year later
 William V of Montferrat
 Matilda, wife of Alberto of Parodi, Margrave of Parodi
 Adelasia, a nun
 Isabella, wife of Guido, Count of Biandrate

References

Sources
 

11th-century French people
11th-century French women 
12th-century French people
12th-century French women 
Gisela
Marchionesses of Montferrat
Gisela
1075 births
1133 deaths